Xolani Mahlaba (born 22 May 1998) is a South African cricketer. He made his Twenty20 debut for Easterns against Border in the 2016 Africa T20 Cup on 9 September 2016. He made his first-class debut for KwaZulu-Natal Inland in the 2018–19 CSA 3-Day Provincial Cup on 14 March 2019.

References

External links
 

1998 births
Living people
South African cricketers
Easterns cricketers
KwaZulu-Natal Inland cricketers
Place of birth missing (living people)